Road to the Octagon is the eleventh full-length studio album from Finnish black metal band Impaled Nazarene.  It was released, as are all of their albums thus far, on Osmose Productions in 2010.  It also marked the first time that they were without a co-producer (Tapio Penannen co-produced their last few).

Track listing
All songs written by Impaled Nazarene, except where noted (published By Les Editions Hurlantes).

"Enlightenment Process" 2:19
"The Day Of Reckoning" 2:48
"Corpses" 2:45
"Under Attack" (Mika "Sluti666" Luttinen, Jarno Anttila) 2:44
"Tentacles of the Octagon" 1:33
"Reflect on This" 2:17
"Convulsing Uncontrollably" 2:15
"Cult of the Goat" 3:09
"Gag Reflex" 3:00
"The Plan" 2:01
"Silent & Violent Type" 2:19
"Execute Tapeworm Extermination" 2:10
"Rhetoric Infernal" 4:23

Personnel
Note: The band have, for most of their career, been a quintet.  For this recording however, they became a quartet when long-serving lead player Jarno Anttila left the band after this recording (though he did contribute to the writing of the record).  For this disc, the personnel is as follows:
Mika Luttinen – vocals
Tomi Ullgren – lead and rhythm guitars
Mikael Arnkil – bass
Reima Kellokoski – drums, percussion

Production
Arranged and produced by Impaled Nazarene
Recorded and mixed by Max "Miami/Safari" Kostermaa (Mixed at Studio Fungus, August 2010)
Mastered by Mika Jussila (Finnvox Studios, August 2010)

References

Impaled Nazarene albums
Osmose Productions albums
2010 albums